"The One Where the Monkey Gets Away" is the nineteenth episode of Friends first season. It first aired on the NBC network in the United States on March 9, 1995.

Plot
Rachel finds out that her ex-fiancé, Barry, is engaged to marry Mindy, the woman who was to be Rachel's maid of honor. Ross still pines over Rachel, and is about to ask her out when he's interrupted by the rest of the gang. He asks Rachel to watch Marcel for him, but Rachel lets him escape. Not knowing that Ross' ownership of Marcel is illegal, she calls Animal Control for assistance.

The responding Animal control agent, Luisa (Megan Cavanagh), is a former high school classmate of Rachel and the Gellers. Since Luisa was none too fond of Rachel, she isn't willing to cut any slack. She eventually relents when she accidentally shoots Phoebe in the rear with a tranquilizer dart and Rachel threatens to report her.

After they get Marcel back, Ross is about to tell Rachel of his feelings when Barry bursts in and tells Rachel he's still in love with her.

Reception
In the original broadcast, the episode was viewed by 29.4 million viewers. Sam Ashurst from Digital Spy ranked the episode #235 on his ranking of the 236 Friends episodes. Telegraph & Argus ranked "The One Where the Monkey Gets Away" #206 on their ranking of all 236 Friends episodes. In a joint review with "The One with All the Poker", "The One Where the Monkey Gets Away" received a mixed review from the AV club.

References

1995 American television episodes
Friends (season 1) episodes